The Bellonids, sometimes called the Bellonid Dynasty, were the counts descended from the Goth Belló who ruled in Carcassonne, Urgell, Cerdanya, County of Conflent, Barcelona, and numerous other Catalan and Septimanian counties and marches in the 9th and 10th centuries. His most famous grandson was Wilfred the Hairy, who founded the House of Barcelona, rulers of the County of Barcelona from 878, and since 1164 the Crown of Aragon, until the end of the reign of Martin the Humane in 1410.

Since the early years of the 10th century all of the eastern counties of the March of Barcelona, and the counties of Conflent, Carcassonne, Foix and Razès of the March of Gothia, were ruled by Belló's descendants. This would have favored the co-ruling of some territories, and a clan-like network of mutual support, although they would have also been exposed to the risk of endogamy.

Notes

Gothic families
Spanish royal families
Medieval Catalonia
9th century in Spain
10th century in Spain